Janka is a given name or surname of Hebrew origin.

Janka may also refer to:
Janka, Contai, settlement in Contai subdivision, West Bengal, India
Janka (Tampere), a suburb in Tampere, Finland
Janka hardness test, test for wood
Janka, original name of Janna (TV series), a German-Polish children's television series

See also 
 Yanka (disambiguation)